The Iran robotics team represents Iran team in the FIRST Global Challenge among more than 190 countries and has been participating in this challenge since 2017.

History 
In 2017, this team entered the first season of this challenge as the only representative of Iran under the head coach, Mohammadreza Karami. Then they participated in the 2018 Mexico and 2019 Dubai challenges.
In 2020, the fourth season of this challenge, team Iran participated with 35 students, and succeeded to make it to the top 20 teams, with two projects, an intelligent system for managing and saving water consumption and a device for disinfecting clothes and equipment. The team also achieved the Best Mentor Award along with 8 other countries.
The fourth and fifth season of this challenge have been held online for the past two years due to COVID-19 pandemic. In the fifth round of the challenge in 2021, team Iran, won the second place in the FIRST Global Grand Challenge Award in the Environment branch by presenting the Smart trash can for compost production. 
This team, which has been continuously invited to the challenge by the managers of the FIRST Global since the first season, this year, after the official invitation, is busy with planning and preparing for participating in the sixth consecutive year of this challenge in Switzerland. The current manager and supervisor of this team is Mohammad Reza Karmi.

References

Robotics in Iran